Charles Springer Tavern, also known as the Oak Hill Inn, Four Mile Inn, and Sign of the Three Tons, is a historic inn and tavern located near Wilmington, New Castle County, Delaware, USA. The building is a two-story, log and stone building that evolved in four major construction phases during the period from 1750 to 1850. The oldest section is a two-story, two-bay, gable-roofed log section. A stone, two-story, two-bay, gable-roofed section was added about 1780; the roof level, window and door openings and floor levels were subsequently raised on the original log section; and a stone, -story lean-to was added on the rear wall of the log section. It has been a residence since the early 20th century. It is in a vernacular Federal style. Also on the property are the contributing ruins of a stone barn built in 1852, the ruins of a stone springhouse, and a stone mileage marker identifying the location as being four miles from the City of Wilmington.

It was added to the National Register of Historic Places in 1992.

References

Houses on the National Register of Historic Places in Delaware
Federal architecture in Delaware
Houses completed in 1750
Houses in Wilmington, Delaware
National Register of Historic Places in Wilmington, Delaware